Pray TV may refer to:

Film and TV
Pray TV (1980 film), comedy film spoofing televangelism starring Dabney Coleman
Pray TV (1982 film), made-for-television drama film about televangelism starring John Ritter and Ned Beatty

Music
Pray TV (band), indie pop/Indie rock band from Melbourne, Australia